James at 15 (later James at 16) is an American drama series that aired on NBC during the 1977–1978 season.

The series was preceded by the 1977 made-for-TV movie James at 15, which aired on Monday September 5, 1977, and was intended as a pilot for the series. Both were written by Dan Wakefield, a journalist and fiction writer whose novel Going All the Way, a tale of coming of age in the 1950s, had led to his being contacted by David Sontag of Twentieth Century Fox.

Sontag, the senior vice-president of creative affairs at Fox, had had a lunch meeting in New York City with Paul Klein, the head of programming at NBC. Klein said he needed a series for Sunday night. On the spot, Sontag created the idea for a coming-of-age series seen through the eyes of a teenage boy, including his dreams, fantasies, and hopes. Klein loved the idea and asked Sontag who would write it, with Sontag consequently suggesting Dan Wakefield. Despite an unsourced account of the creation of the series, the on-screen credit reads "Created by Dan Wakefield."

Synopsis
Protagonist James Hunter (Lance Kerwin) is the son of a college professor (Linden Chiles) who has moved his family across the country to take a teaching job, transplanting James from Oregon to Boston, Massachusetts. James, who had Walter Mitty-like dreams and dabbles in photography, has a hard time fitting into his new surroundings. During the series run, when James turned 16, the title was updated accordingly.

Wakefield, who was born and raised in Indianapolis but eventually moved to Boston, said he chose Boston both because he wanted to write about a city he knew well and also because he was tired of television's tendency to give programs Los Angeles or New York City settings. To update his own memories of growing up, the writer spoke with adolescents from Boston.

Cast
 Lance Kerwin as James Hunter
 Linden Chiles as Paul Hunter, James' father
 Lynn Carlin as Joan Hunter, James' mother
 Kim Richards as Sandy Hunter, James' sister
 Deirdre Berthrong as Kathy Hunter, James' sister
 David Raynr as Ludwig "Sly" Hazeltine, James' friend (billed as David Hubbard)
 Susan Myers as Marlene Mahoney, James' friend
 Kevin Van Wieringen as a deaf student in James' class

TV movie
The movie premiered to high ratings, topping the ratings for the week of September 5–11, 1977, with a 42% share of the viewing audience, quickly prompting NBC to approve a series. Associated Press writer Jerry Buck said of the pilot movie that it "captures the essence of growing up in America," adding, "It makes up for all the drivel we've had to put up with, such as Sons and Daughters and Hollywood High."

Critical reception and controversy
The show was highly praised for its realism and sensitivity, with a New York Times reviewer applauding the program's avoidance of stereotyping characters: "Sly, a jiving black student ... has solidly middle-class parents deeply involved in classical music" and a lower-middle-class classmate discovers that her father makes more money as a plumber than James' professor father. Tom Shales of The Washington Post opined:Not perfect, not revolutionary, not always deliriously urgent, James at 15 is still the most respectable new entertainment series of the season. Consistently, it communicates something about the state of being young, rather than just communicating that it wishes to lure young viewers. And if it romanticizes adolescence through the weekly trials and triumphs of its teen-age hero, at least it does so in more ambitious, inquisitive and authentic ways than the average TV teeny-bop. 

Critics also approved of its handling of James' first sexual experience, with a Swedish exchange student (Kirsten Baker) in the episode which aired February 9, 1978— at which point the show assumed the name James at 16. However, head writer Wakefield quit in a dispute with NBC over the use of the euphemism responsible for 'birth control' in the episode, as well as the network's insistence that James should feel remorse over his decision.

Behind the scenes, the show's original executive producers, Martin Manulis and Joe Hardy, were replaced by Ron Rubin in December 1977. Despite the critical acclaim, the show lasted only one season. Kerwin was actually 16 when the series began, and had turned 17 when it was cancelled.

Awards and nominations

Novelization
Two novels were written by author April Smith, James at 15 and Friends.

Legacy
Kevin Williamson, the creator of Dawson's Creek, cited this show as a major influence on him and named it as an inspiration for his show. Williamson said, "Dawson's Creek came out of my desire to do James at 15 for the '90s. It was very provocative and way ahead of its time."

The Beastie Boys refer to the show in their song "Hey Ladies" ("I'm not James at 15 or Chachi in charge..."), from the album Paul's Boutique.

Notes

External links
  (pilot TV-movie)
  (series)

1970s American drama television series
1970s American high school television series
1977 American television series debuts
1978 American television series endings
English-language television shows
NBC original programming
Television series about teenagers
Television series by 20th Century Fox Television
Television shows set in Boston
Coming-of-age television shows